Comeaux is a surname. Notable people with the surname include:

Amie Comeaux (1976–1997), American country music singer
Darren Comeaux (born 1960), American football linebacker
John Comeaux (born 1943), American basketball player

See also
Ovey Comeaux High School, Lafayette, Louisiana